Weiqiao may refer to the following locations in China:

 Weiqiao, Hebei (魏桥镇), town in Shenzhou City
 Weiqiao, Shandong (魏桥镇), town in Zouping County
 Weiqiao Township, Anhui (渭桥乡), in Xiuning County
 Weiqiao Township, Jiangsu (维桥乡), in Xuyi County

It may also refer to:
Shandong Weiqiao Pioneering Group (山東魏橋創業), a company